Kralice nad Oslavou (until 1900 Králice, until 1960 just Kralice) is a municipality and village in Třebíč District in the Vysočina Region of the Czech Republic. It has about 1,000 inhabitants.

Administrative parts
The village of Horní Lhotice is an administrative part of Kralice nad Oslavou.

Geography
It lies mostly in the Křižanov Highlands, but the southern part of the municipal territory extends into the Jevišovice Uplands. There are several small ponds in the territory.

History

The first written mention of Kralice is from 1379, when a fortress was here.

In the Kralice Fortress a secret printing shop of the Unity of the Brethren was hidden, in which the Bible of Kralice, the first complete translation of the Bible from the original languages into the Czech language, was printed between 1579 and 1593.

Sights
The landmark of the village is the Church of Saint Martin. It is a Gothic church from the 14th century with Renaissance modifications.

Fragments of the local two-storey fortress have been preserved to this day. Remains of walls and cellars have been preserved, which were discovered during an archaeological survey.

Memorial of the Bible of Kralice was built in 1967–1969. The memorial, managed by Moravské zemské muzeum in Brno, contained an exhibition about local archaeological research, the activities of the Brethren printing house, and an exhibition about J. A. Comenius. However, it was closed until further notice due to technical reasons.

Notable people
Anna Pammrová (1860–1945), writer, feminist and philosopher

References

External links

Villages in Třebíč District